Adam Papalia is an Australian sports commentator for Fox Sports and radio station 6PR. 

Papalia has covered an average of 60 games a season calling the NBL, A-League and the AFL, after completing a sports broadcasting course at Edith Cowan University. In 2016, he joined the Fox Footy broadcast team, commentating a game each Saturday, and sometimes on Sunday if there is a game played in Perth.

References

Year of birth missing (living people)
Living people
Australian rules football commentators
 
People from Perth, Western Australia